The 2018–19 Superliga was the 63rd season of the Polish Superliga, the top men's handball league in Poland. A total of fourteen teams contested this season's league, which began on 31 August 2018 and concluded on 29 May 2019. 

PGE Vive Kielce won their 16th title of the Polish Champions.

Format

Regular season

Standings

Results

Relegation round

Standings

Results

Playoffs

|}

Playoffs

Final standings

References

External links
 Official website 

Poland
Superliga
Superliga
Superliga
Superliga